Andrea Betzner and Judith Wiesner were the defending champions but only Wiesner competed that year with Sabrina Goleš.

Goleš and Wiesner won in the final 7–5, 6–0 against Silke Frankl and Sabine Hack.

Seeds
Champion seeds are indicated in bold text while text in italics indicates the round in which those seeds were eliminated.

 Sabrina Goleš /  Judith Wiesner (champions)
 Gabriela Mosca /  Emilse Raponi-Longo (first round)
 Iva Budařová /  Patricia Medrado (quarterfinals)
 Anna-Karin Olsson /  Alison Scott (semifinals)

Draw

References
 1988 Athens Trophy Doubles Draw

Athens Trophy
1988 WTA Tour